Pentaneurini is a tribe of midges in the non-biting midge family (Chironomidae).

Genera & Species
 Genus Ablabesmyia Johannsen, 1905
A. longistyla Fittkau, 1962
A. monilis (Linnaeus, 1758)
A. phatta (Egger, 1863)
 Genus Arctopelopia Fittkau, 1962
A. barbitarsis (Zetterstedt, 1850)
A. griseipennis (van der Wulp, 1858)
A. melanosoma (Goetghebuer, 1933)
 Genus Coffmania Hazra & Chaudhuri, 2000
C. adiecta Hazra & Chaudhuri, 2000
C. animispina Hazra & Chaudhuri, 2000
 Genus Conchapelopia Fittkau, 1957
C. aagardi Murray, 1987
C. melanops (Meigen, 1818)
C. pallidula (Meigen, 1818)
C. viator (Kieffer, 1911)
 Genus Guttipelopia Fittkau, 1962
G. guttipennis (van der Wulp, 1861)
 Genus Hayesomyia Murray & Fittkau, 1985
H. tripunctata (Goetghebuer, 1922)
 Genus Helopelopia Roback, 1971
H. cornuticaudata (Walley, 1925)
H. pilicaudata (Walley, 1925)
 Genus Hudsonimyia Roback, 1979
H. karelena Roback, 1979
H. parrishi Caldwell & Soponis, 1982
 Genus Krenopelopia Fittkau, 1962
K. binotata (Wiedemann, 1817)
K. nigropunctata (Staeger,  839)
 Genus Labrundinia Fittkau, 1962
L. longipalpis (Goetghebuer, 1921)
 Genus Larsia Fittkau, 1962
L. atrocincta (Goetghebuer, 1942)
L. curticalcar (Kieffer, 1918)
 Genus Monopelopia Fittkau, 1962
M. tenuicalcar (Kieffer, 1918)
 Genus Nilotanypus Kieffer, 1923
N. dubius (Meigen, 1804)
 Genus Paramerina Fittkau, 1962
P. cingulata (Stephens in Walker, 1856), preocc.
P. divisa (Walker, 1856)
 Genus Rheopelopia Fittkau, 1962
R. eximia (Edwards, 1929)
R. maculipennis (Zetterstedt, 838])
R. ornata (Meigen, 1838)
 Genus Schineriella Murray & Fittkau, 1988
S. schineri (Strobl, 1880)
 Genus Telmatopelopia Fittkau, 1962
T. nemorum (Goetghebuer, 1921)
 Genus Thienemannimyia Fittkau, 1957
T. carnea (Fabricius, 1805)
T. festiva (Meigen, 1838)
T. fusciceps (Edwards, 1929)
T. geijkesi (Goetghebuer, 1934)
T. laeta (Meigen, 1818)
T. lentiginosa (Fries, 1823)
T. northumbrica (Edwards, 1929)
T. pseudocarnea Murray, 1976
T. woodi (Edwards, 1929)
 Genus Trissopelopia Kieffer, 1923
T. longimana (Staeger, 1839)
 Genus Xenopelopia Fittkau, 1962
X. falcigera (Kieffer, 1911)
X. nigricans (Goetghebuer, 1927)
 Genus Zavrelimyia Fittkau, 1962
Z. barbatipes (Kieffer, 1911)
Z. hirtimana (Kieffer, 1918)
Z. melanura (Meigen, 1804)
Z. nubila (Meigen, 1830)

References

Tanypodinae